William Garrett Lewis (1821–1885) was a Baptist preacher and pastor of Westbourne Grove Church in Bayswater, London for 33 years. He was an apologist author of two books, Westbourne Grove Sermons and The Trades and Industrial Occupations of the Bible, published by the Religious Tract Society.

Influence 
Lewis co-founded the London Baptist Association (within the Baptist Union of Great Britain) along with Charles Haddon Spurgeon and several other pastors. He was instrumental in urging James Hudson Taylor to publish China's Spiritual Need and Claims. His influence on both of these men is noteworthy.

Spurgeon was encouraged by this fellow Baptist preacher, while he was beginning his ministry at the age of 19.

Taylor, who was a member of Lewis' congregation, had lectured about the need for missionary work to be done in China, and as a result of compiling his lecture material into a book form, hundreds of missionaries were inspired to follow him back to China in the 1800s. Lewis was Taylor's pastor during the formative time of the China Inland Mission in 1865, and continued in support of the work, acting as a referee for the agency in 1872.

Lewis was undoubtedly closely associated with the Anti-Opium Campaign led by another member of his congregation, Benjamin Broomhall, who sought to end British trade in the drug in China. The Broomhall children, too, grew up under the influence of this man, including author and missionary Marshall Broomhall.

Lewis, speaking at the ceremony of laying the first stone of the new Metropolitan Tabernacle for the Rev. C. H. Spurgeon, which took place on Tuesday 16 August 1859, said the following.
I feel constrained to address my brethren in the ministry also to hear the appeal which God in his providence makes to them, to be faithful, uncompromising, simple, and bold in their declaration of gospel truths.
—William Garrett Lewis

In January 1881, Lewis was appointed to the pastorate of Dagnall Street Baptist Church. He died in 1885, before the building was finished, and the stained glass window at the rear of the church was dedicated to him.

Works authored 
 Westbourne Grove Sermons 1872
 The Trades and Industrial Occupations of the Bible Religious Tract Society 1874

References

Notes

External links 
 Westbourne Grove Church
 Dagnall Street Baptist Church

19th-century English Baptist ministers
English sermon writers
Christianity in London
Burials at Kensal Green Cemetery
1885 deaths
1821 births